The Córas Iompair Éireann 001 Class locomotive was manufactured by Metropolitan-Vickers at their Dukinfield Works in Manchester.  The 001 Class locomotive was the backbone of mainline passenger and freight train services on the Irish railway network for forty years from 1955 until the mid-1990s when they were replaced by the new 201 Class.

Engines

Crossley
Initially they were fitted with eight-cylinder two-stroke, port-controlled Crossley engines. These were a loop scavenge type, which utilised a patented principle that recycled the normally wasted exhaust-pressure pulse to boost charge air in the cylinder. They produced  at 625 rpm and could do . The original sandboxes, which were used to improve traction with the rail, were removed after a few years.

Their Crossley engines proved to be notoriously unreliable from the start. Amongst a plethora of problems were:
 Unbalanced engines resulting in vibration-induced fuel pipe and water pipe fractures
 Cylinder defects
 Excessive water temperature causing shutdowns

There were also problems with generator and motor flashovers.

Similar problems were also encountered on the Crossley-engined Western Australian Government Railways X Class and British Rail Class 28 locomotives.

EMD
These problems were tackled between 1968 and 1971 through the progressive re-engining of the entire class with a  12-cylinder EMD 645E engine (a similar process was implemented for the original 201 Class). When built, these locomotives were originally numbered A1 to A60, and as locomotives were re-engined, they had the suffix 'R' added to their number. From 1972, the prefix letters were dropped and the locomotives were renumbered 001 to 060.

Accidents and incidents
On Thursday 5 December 1963, locomotive A17 was hauling a passenger train from Westland Row to Westport when it broke down at Mullingar, County Westmeath. Both locomotives were damaged, 16 people were injured.

Preservation
Four A class locomotives survived into preservation, the details of which are outlined in the table below:

Model 
The A Class is available as a 4mm scale (OO) ready-to-run (RTR) model from Irish Railway Models. Announced in October 2018, it was released in October 2021. In the past it has been made as a 00 gauge kit by Silver Fox Models.

References

External links

 Eiretrains - Irish Locomotives
Irish Traction Group webpage for preserved 001 Class No.A3r
Irish Traction Group webpage for preserved 001 Class No.A39
Hells Kitchen Museum, Home of preserved 001 Class No.A55

Iarnród Éireann locomotives
Metropolitan-Vickers locomotives
Co-Co locomotives
Railway locomotives introduced in 1955
5 ft 3 in gauge locomotives
Diesel-electric locomotives of Ireland
Co'Co' Diesel Locomotives of Europe